Takeda is a Japanese family name. It may also refer to:

 The Takeda clan
 Takeda (video game), a PC video game based on the life of Takeda Shingen
 Takeda Shrine, a Shinto shrine in Kōfu, Yamanashi Prefecture, Japan
 Takeda Pharmaceutical Company, a Japanese pharmaceutical company
 4965 Takeda, an asteroid
 Takahashi Takeda, a character in the Mortal Kombat video games
 Takeda Station (Kyoto), a railway station
 Takeda Station (Hyōgo), a railway station
 Taketa, Ōita, a city